Ernests Gulbis was the defending champion but chose not to defend his title.

Radu Albot won the title after defeating Jiří Lehečka 6–2, 7–6(7–5) in the final.

Seeds

Draw

Finals

Top half

Bottom half

References

External links
Main draw
Qualifying draw

Teréga Open Pau–Pyrénées - 1